Curteis Ditch is a minor,  long river—brook—and drainage ditch of the Pevensey Levels in Hailsham, Wealden District of East Sussex, England. It rises from Church Farm Ditch and flows a southerly course into Kentland Sewer. Curteis Ditch also gives rise to and receives the waters of several unnamed streams.

References 

Rivers of East Sussex
Rivers of the Pevensey Levels